Rineloricaria lanceolata, commonly known as the chocolate-colored catfish or the chocolate whiptail catfish, is a species of catfish in the family Loricariidae. It is native to South America, where it occurs in the upper Amazon River basin in Brazil and Peru. It is reportedly typically found in sandy environments with leaf litter. It is omnivorous, feeding on periphyton and small invertebrates. The species reaches 12.3 cm (4.8 inches) in total length and is believed to be a facultative air-breather. 

Rineloricaria lanceolata frequently appears in the aquarium trade, where it is considered a peaceful species that will accept a variety of food items, feeding on vegetable matter, dried foods, and small live or frozen invertebrates such as Daphnia or insect larvae. It will reportedly breed readily in captivity if the correct conditions are present.

References

Loricariini
Fish of South America
Fish described in 1868
Taxa named by Albert Günther